Voria Ghafouri (born 18 September 1987) is an Iranian footballer who plays for the Persian Gulf Pro League club Foolad, for which he is captain, and the Iran national team. He has played much of his career as a right-back and also played as a right winger occasionally.

Before joining Esteghlal in 2016, Ghafouri spent a successful two-year spell with Sepahan, winning the Iranian League in 2015. Ghafouri debuted for Iran in 2014 against South Korea. He was part of Iran's squad in the 2015 and 2019 AFC Asian Cup.

During the 2022 World Cup, Voria Ghafouri was arrested for speaking publicly online against violent repression of Iranian protesters. He is an activist for the civil rights of Iranian women and has repeatedly published his views.

Club career

Early years
Ghafouri played his entire career for Pas Hamedan until 2010 when he signed with Shahrdari Tabriz. He later signed with Naft Tehran.

Sepahan
In July 2014 Ghafouri signed a two-year contract with Sepahan.

Ghafouri was named "Persian Gulf Pro League Defender of the year" by F.F.I.R.I. at the end of 2014–15 season.

Esteghlal
On 5 June 2016, he signed with Esteghlal on a two-year contract, reuniting him with his former manager at Naft Tehran, Alireza Mansourian. He announced on his Instagram account that he will wear number 21, the same number he used to wear in his previous teams.

He made his debut for the club in a 1–1 draw against his former team, Naft Tehran. His first season with Esteghlal was a frustrating one for Ghafouri as he missed 13 matches in total due to various injuries which limited him to making just 17 appearances for the season in the league.

Ghafouri scored his first goal for Esteghlal in a 3–0 win against Esteghlal Khuzestan on 28 December 2017. On 1 March 2018, he scored Esteghlal's winning goal against Persepolis in the Tehran derby. His performance elected him as Man of the match. He was also named as the best right back in Football Tribe's Asia best eleven of the month for his display in March. On 2 April, Ghafouri scored his first AFC Champions League goal from the penalty spot in a 2–0 win against Al-Rayyan, securing qualification for the Round of 16 as Group D winners. He scored another goal in the following match against Al-Hilal and was named Man of the match for his performance. He finished his second season with 6 goals in 34 appearances in all competition as Esteghlal finished the season in third in the league, won the Hazfi Cup and qualified for the quarter-finals of Champions League.

In June 2018, Ghafouri signed a new contract keeping him at Esteghlal for another season. From the start of the 2018–19 season, Esteghlal's manager Winfried Schäfer, led to him being deployed in right-wing positions, a place where he'd occasionally played in his previous teams. On 2 August, he scored the first brace of his career in a 2–2 draw with Zob Ahan in Isfahan. On 26 November, he captained his side for the first time in a 0–1 defeat against his former team Sepahan.

On 2 June 2019, Ghafouri signed a contract extension that will keep him at the club until 2021. At the beginning of the 2019–20 campaign, following the departure of Esteghlal's captain Mehdi Rahmati, Andrea Stramaccioni made him the blues captain.

Esteghlal went on to win the 2021–22 Persian Gulf Pro League, becoming the first team in the league to go through the entire domestic league season unbeaten.

International career
He was called up to Iran national football team in October 2014 by Carlos Queiroz. He made his debut in a 1–0 win against South Korea on 18 November 2014 entering as a substitute for Khosro Heydari.

Ghafouri was selected for the Iranian 2015 AFC Asian Cup squad on 30 December 2014 by Carlos Queiroz. Despite a successful group phase, where Iran won all their games with him featuring in all matches, Ghafouri did not achieve international glory as the team were beaten by Iraq in penalties which he successfully converted his turn in the first knockout stage of the tournament. Due to his performance in the tournament, he was voted as the surprise player of the tournament by the fans.

In May 2018 he was named in Iran's preliminary squad for the 2018 World Cup in Russia. however he did not make the final 23.

Ghafouri was named in the Iranian squad for 2019 AFC Asian Cup. After sitting out the first game against Yemen, he made his first appearance in the competition on 12 January and played the entire 2–0 win over Vietnam.

Style of play
Known for his pace and great crosses. He is regarded as one of the best right-backs of Iran. He also is considered as a set-piece specialist as he takes most of the penalties and free-kicks.

Activism

Ghafouri regularly criticizes the general problems of society in Iran on his social media. In February 2019, after Mohammad Javad Zarif the Foreign Minister of Iran stated: "We are proud of being under pressure defending the people of Palestine, Lebanon, Yemen and Syria", Ghafouri posted a story on his Instagram account, criticizing him by saying: "You are not under pressure. As a matter of fact, it is the ordinary people who are under pressure." On 18 February, Iranian Supreme Leader Ayatollah Ali Khamenei stated: "Some people, who benefit from the country's peace and security enjoying their jobs and their favourite sports, bite the hand that feeds them" which was claimed to be referring to Ghafouri and fellow footballer Ali Karimi. A few hours after Khamenei's speech, he was summoned by the Ministry of Sport and Youth to give an explanation about his comments on Zarif. After being summoned, many fellow footballers supported him on their social media. During Esteghlal's next home game against Pars Jonoubi Jam, fans chanted his name at the 21-minute mark (as his shirt number is 21) to show their support to him.

Ghafouri has also repeatedly expressed support for the right of women to attend football matches in Iran. In 2019, he distributed blue jerseys in honor of the "Blue Girl" Sahar Khodayari, a woman who self-immolated after she was sentenced to prison for attempting to watch an Esteghal match at Azadi Stadium. Following another incident of violence against female football fans in 2021, Ghafouri wrote on Instagram 
"As a soccer player, I’ve indeed become humiliated when I play in an era when our mothers and sisters are prohibited from entering stadiums." In 2022 Iran lifted its 40-year ban on women's attendance at football stadiums. In appreciation for his support, during the first Esteghal match open to women at Azadi Stadium on August 25, 2022, female fans reportedly shouted Ghafouri's name and "Voria, your words are the nation’s words."

In June 2022, Ghafouri announced Esteghal owners had refused to renew his contract for the 2023 season, which many observers alleged was in retaliation to his outspoken criticism of the government.

2022 protests

In June 2022, Iranian Minister of Roads and Urban Development Rostam Ghasemi threatened Ghafouri accusing him of being a Kurdish separatist after he tweeted the word "Kurdistan" twice; however he denied the accusation later by stating that he would sacrifice his life for Iran.

On 24 November, Ghafouri was arrested by Iranian security forces after posting a call on social media for the government to end its violence against Kurds.

Personal life
Born in Sanandaj, Kurdistan Province, Ghafouri is of Kurdish descent. Ghafouri and his wife Mona Ardalan have two children: son Radin and daughter Barin (born 2017). He cites Dani Alves and Frank Lampard as his favourite football players.

On 6 July 2020, Esteghlal announced Ghafouri and other 8 players have tested positive for COVID-19.

Career statistics

Club

International

Honours

Sepahan
Iran Pro League: 2014–15

Esteghlal
Iran Pro League: 2021–22
Hazfi Cup: 2017–18

Individual
Persian Gulf Pro League Defender of the Year: 2015
Persian Gulf Pro League Team of the Year: 2014–15, 2017–18
Navad Player of the Month: February 2018, March 2018

References

External links

 

1987 births
Living people
Pas players
Iranian footballers
Kurdish sportspeople
Persian Gulf Pro League players
Shahrdari Tabriz players
Naft Tehran F.C. players
Esteghlal F.C. players
2015 AFC Asian Cup players
Iranian Sunni Muslims
People from Sanandaj
Iranian Kurdish people
Association football midfielders
Association football fullbacks
2019 AFC Asian Cup players
20th-century Iranian people
21st-century Iranian people
Iran international footballers